Because You Loved Me: The Songs of Diane Warren is an album by American pop singer Johnny Mathis that was released on October 20, 1998, by Columbia Records on which he covers 10 of the songwriter's hits.

Reception
William Ruhlmann of AllMusic gave the album a four-star rating, saying that "this is a distinguished step on Diane Warren's path to full recognition of her talents, and a typically high-quality effort from Mathis as well."

Track listing
All songs written by Diane Warren, except as noted:

 "Un-Break My Heart" – 5:01
 Rick Hunt – arrangement; synth programming; keyboards  
 Rafael Padilla – percussion  
 Michael Landau – electric guitar 
 Dean Parks – acoustic guitar 
 Kenny O'Brien – background vocals  
 Francis Benitez – background vocals  
 Natisse "Bambi" Jones – background vocals  
 "Love Will Lead You Back" – 5:09
 Tony Smith – arrangement; synth programming; keyboards  
 Rafael Padilla – percussion  
 Michael Landau – electric and acoustic guitars  
 Kenny O'Brien – background vocals  
 Francis Benitez – background vocals  
 Kenya Hathaway – background vocals  
 "Don't Take Away My Heaven" – 4:38
 Lester Mendez – arrangement; synth programming; keyboards  
 Michael Landau – electric guitars 
 Kenny O'Brien – background vocals  
 Francis Benitez – background vocals  
 Natisse "Bambi" Jones – background vocals  
 "If You Asked Me To" – 4:13
 Lester Mendez – arrangement; synth programming; keyboards  
 Rafael Padilla – percussion  
 Michael Landau – electric guitars 
 Kenny O'Brien – background vocals  
 Francis Benitez – background vocals  
 Natisse "Bambi" Jones – background vocals  
 "By the Time This Night Is Over" (Michael Bolton, Andy Goldmark, Warren) – 4:39
 Tony Smith – arrangement; synth programming; keyboards  
 Rafael Padilla – percussion  
 Kenny O'Brien – background vocals  
 Francis Benitez – background vocals  
 Kenya Hathaway – background vocals  
 "Because You Loved Me" – 4:37
 David Foster – arrangement; synth programming  
 Lester Mendez – additional keyboards  
 Michael Landau – electric guitars 
 Kenny O'Brien – background vocals  
 Francis Benitez – background vocals  
 Bernadette "Brandy" Jones – background vocals  
 "All I Want Is Forever" – 4:28
 Lester Mendez – arrangement; synth programming; keyboards  
 Michael Landau – electric guitar 
 Kenny O'Brien – background vocals  
 Francis Benitez – background vocals  
 Natisse "Bambi" Jones – background vocals  
 "Set the Night to Music" – 5:10
 Danny Luchansky – arrangement; synth programming; keyboards  
 Michael Landau – electric guitars 
 David Boruff – tenor sax  
 Kenny O'Brien – arrangement; background vocals  
 Francis Benitez – background vocals  
 Natisse "Bambi" Jones – background vocals  
 "Live for Loving You" (Emilio Estefan Jr., Gloria Estefan, Warren) – 5:39
 Lester Mendez – arrangement; synth programming; keyboards  
 Rafael Padilla – percussion  
 Michael Landau – electric guitars 
 Kenny O'Brien – background vocals  
 Francis Benitez – background vocals  
 Natisse "Bambi" Jones – background vocals  
 "Missing You Now" (Walter Afanasieff, Michael Bolton, Warren) – 4:24
 Danny Luchansky – arrangement; synth programming; keyboards  
 Michael Landau – electric guitars 
 Rafael Padilla – percussion  
 Kenny O'Brien – arrangement; background vocals  
 Francis Benitez – background vocals  
 Natisse "Bambi" Jones – background vocals

Personnel
From the liner notes for the original album:

Johnny Mathis – vocals
Humberto Gatica – producer, recording engineer, mixer
Alex Rodriguez – additional engineering
Chris Brooke – assistant; additional engineering
Cristian Robles – assistant; additional engineering
Frederic Sarhagen – assistant
Joanna Ifrah – A&R direction
Vlado Meller – mastering
Danny Luchansky – Pro Tools editor
Kenny O'Brien – Pro Tools editor
Christine Wilson – art direction/design
David Vance – photography
Mixed at Westlake Recording Studios, Los Angeles, California
Mastered at Sony Music Studios, New York, New York

References

1998 albums
Johnny Mathis albums
Albums produced by Humberto Gatica
Columbia Records albums
Covers albums